Howard Richter (born 18 May,1935) is an Australian boxer. He competed in the men's middleweight event at the 1956 Summer Olympics.

Howard (or Snow) and his brother Graham Richter founded Richter Engineering and became a worldwide agricultural machinery inventors.

He married Rosanna O’Sullivan, in 1966, a socialite of the late Emil and Addie O’Sullivan.

Whilst Howard does not have contact with his firstborn son Gavin, his first daughter Carey, was born in August 1967, followed by his second daughter Kate, in 1969. Howard and his daughters are still very close.

Upon his divorce from Rosanna O’Sullivan, he married Leonie Middleton who had three children of her own.

They resided in the scenic  town of Boonah, until 1987 and upon retirement Howard left Boonah and retired on the Gold Coast.

Howard (Snow), was invited by the International Olympic committee to carry the torch for the 2000 Olympics which he did, and chose to do in his home town of Boonah.

Since retirement, Howard or “Snow” has embraced his love of art and produced many beautiful paintings, for which he has had several showings and sold many pieces.

”Snow” currently resides on the Gold Coast with his wife Leonie.

References

1935 births
Living people
Australian male boxers
Olympic boxers of Australia
Boxers at the 1956 Summer Olympics
Place of birth missing (living people)
Middleweight boxers